José Manuel da Silva, Baron of Tietê (1793 – 27 March 1877) was a banker and politician from São Paulo. He was a member of the general council of the province and was elected to the Chamber of Deputies in Rio de Janeiro and the triple list of candidates for a senate seat.  José Manuel was vice-president of São Paulo on multiple occasions during his lifetime, serving for the first time in 1839.  He acted as interim president of the province of São Paulo in 1852, 1868 and 1871.

Footnotes

References 
 
 
 
 
 
 
 
 

Brazilian bankers
Brazilian politicians
1793 births
1877 deaths
Brazilian nobility